The German and Ashkenazi Jewish surname Eisenberg may be rendered in different ways via other languages.
Aizenberg is a phonetic transliteration commonly via Russian Айзенберг.  
Ajsenberg is a Polish-language rendering.
Other variants include Aisenberg, Aisemberg, etc.

Notable people with these surnames include:

Joanna Aizenberg,  Russian-born chemist and biomimetics expert
Geraldine Aizenberg
Roberto Aizenberg (1928–1996), Argentine painter and sculptor
Isaac Aisemberg (1918-1997),  writer, screenwriter and Argentine dramatist
Fay Ajzenberg-Selove (1926-2012), American nuclear physicist
Alan Aisenberg (born 1993), American actor

See also

Eizenberg

German-language surnames
Yiddish-language surnames
Jewish surnames